George Agar, 1st Baron Callan PC (4 December 1751 – 29 October 1815) was an Anglo-Irish politician and peer.

Agar was the third son of James Agar, of Ringwood, County Kilkenny, by the Honourable Rebecca Flower, daughter of William Flower, 1st Baron Castle Durrow and Edith Caulfeild. Ellis Bermingham, Countess of Brandon, was his aunt. His father was killed in a duel with Henry Flood in 1769, the culmination of a long and bitter political feud. He was educated at Eton and Trinity Hall, Cambridge.

Agar was returned to the Irish House of Commons for Callan in 1776, a seat he held until 1790, and was admitted to the Irish Privy Council in 1789. In 1790 he was elevated to the Peerage of Ireland as Baron Callan, of Callan in the County of Kilkenny. In 1801 he was elected as one of the original 28 Irish Representative peers to sit in the British House of Lords.

Lord Callan never married and the title became extinct on his death in October 1815, aged 63.

References

1751 births
1815 deaths
18th-century Anglo-Irish people
19th-century Anglo-Irish people
People educated at Eton College
Alumni of Trinity Hall, Cambridge
Barons in the Peerage of Ireland
Members of the Privy Council of Ireland
Irish representative peers
Agar
Agar
Agar
Members of the Irish House of Lords
Peers of Ireland created by George III